Henry John Gauntlett (9 July 1805 in Wellington, Shropshire – 21 February 1876 in London) was an English organist and songwriter known in British music circles for his authorship of many hymns and other pieces for the organ.

Biography
Henry John Gauntlett was born in Britain on 9 July 1805, at Wellington, Shropshire. He became the organist at Olney church in Buckinghamshire, where his father Henry Gauntlett was then curate, and later vicar, at the age of nine.

He was intended for a career in law, and he remained a lawyer until he was almost forty years of age, when he abandoned the profession and devoted himself to music.

He was organist at a number of leading London churches, including St Olave's in Tooley Street, Southwark from 1827 to 1846, where he designed a new grand organ which was built, installed and perfected to his satisfaction between 1844 and March 1846, and Union Chapel, Islington from 1852 to 1861.

Eventually the degree of Mus. Doc. was conferred on him by the Archbishop of Canterbury, he being the first to receive such a degree from that quarter for over 200 years. He did much to raise the standard of church music both mechanically and musically.

In 1852 he patented an "electrical-action apparatus" for organs. He wrote much music and over 1,000 hymn tunes, and edited many hymn books. His most famous tune is "Irby", the tune to which the Christmas carol, "Once in Royal David's City" is usually sung.

Gauntlett died in London aged seventy in 1876 and was buried at Kensal Green Cemetery.

Hymns
 hymn tune 'St Alphege' put to words in Latin 'Sic breve vivitur' by Bernard of Cluny.
 'University College'

References

External links
 
Free scores at the Mutopia Project

1805 births
1876 deaths
Christian hymnwriters
English classical organists
British male organists
People from Olney, Buckinghamshire
People from Wellington, Shropshire
Burials at Kensal Green Cemetery
19th-century English musicians
19th-century British male musicians
Male classical organists
19th-century organists